James Dean Strauss (July 3, 1929 – March 19, 2014) was an American theologian who was professor of theology and philosophy at Lincoln Christian Seminary from 1967-1994. He has been described by many as the Albert Einstein of the Restoration Movement.

Life
He was born on July 3, 1929 to Earnest and Cleo Strauss in the small town of Herrin, Illinois.  His father was a World War I veteran who worked as a coal miner and bookkeeper for Peabody Coal Company.  His mother worked as a nurse and decorations designer for a department store.  His father was a heavy gambler, but a very intelligent man.  
Dr. Strauss seems to have inherited his father's intelligence and his mother's creativity, combining them into a mind to be reckoned with.  His family moved to Catlin, Illinois when James was in the second grade, where he spent the rest of his childhood and youth.  
He lived a rather normal childhood, playing baseball with boys in the neighborhood and listening to The Shadow and The Lone Ranger at night on the radio with his family.  He displayed a sharp mind even while in high school, graduating as salutatorian in his class and voted "most likely to succeed" by his fellow students.

James Strauss died on March 19, 2014.

Dr. Strauss's father was a Disciples of Christ member and his mother a Baptist, but neither attended church during James' childhood.  One day James was invited to the Catlin Church of Christ by a consumer at the grocery store he worked at as a youth.  James went, was converted, and brought his parents.  Upon his conversion, James' father quit gambling, and, as a consequence, their family grew closer.  James was mentored by the elders at that church, who taught him Biblical study methods and Greek.

When James graduated from high school, he went to Cincinnati Christian College to study under R. C. Foster and Grayson Ensign. Proceeding on from there, he attended Christian Theological Seminary and studied under Walter Sykes. By the time he finished his time as a student, he had collected over 500 hours of graduate credit because his mentor died unexpectedly right before he was about to graduate with his 1st doctorate and the program that he was a part of collapsed, so he had to start over.  He earned a B.A. and M.A. from Butler University, a Bachelor of Divinity from Christian Theological Seminary, and a Th.M. from the Chicago Graduate School of Theology. He fulfilled his Ph.D candidacy requirements at Indiana University, but due to a change over in the faculty from one year to the next he did not finish the degree. He does have a D.Min. from Eden Theological Seminary, Webster Groves, Missouri.

Dr. Strauss became Associate Professor of Theology and Philosophy at Lincoln Christian Seminary in 1967 after working for many years as a pastor.  The position had opened up because the professor previously occupying the related position had been released because of the unorthodox views that he held.  
The student body at the time protested this move, as the released professor was popular among the students.  Only later, however, did they realize what they had received in return.  Strauss went on to very nearly be the seminary, as he taught most of the classes offered in a range of programs.  One year the Seminary catalog listed him as teaching forty-seven courses.  There is a cassette tape recording from 1977 of Dr. Strauss listing and briefly describing the classes he would be offering one year, which took over an hour to finish.  Most of his syllabi were approximately 100 pages in length, single-spaced, nonetheless.  He taught classes on Aristotle, Plato, Descartes, Hegel, linguistics, artificial intelligence and the mind, philosophy of science, Biblical exegesis, preaching, theories of knowledge, astrophysics in relation to Christianity, apologetics, archaeology, the nature of man, creative imagination, the Enlightenment, Immanuel Kant, pluralism, classical philosophy, history of philosophy, classical theology, evolution, theology of sin, theology of promise, etc.  Upon his retirement in 1994, he was given the honorary title of Professor Emeritus of Theology and Philosophy. Dr. Strauss is a prolific writer, and has written tens of thousands of pages between his books and essays on topics related to the ones listed above.

References
Knopp, Richard A., and Castelein, John D., Taking Every Thought Captive:  Essays in Honor of James D. Strauss (Joplin, MO: College Press, 1997).

Strauss, James D., Postmodernism, the Emergent Church Movement, and Other Essays (2011).

Strauss, James D., Restoration: The Stone-Campbell Movement from the Enlightenment to Post-Modernism (2011).

Strauss, James D., A Christian Response to Science: And Other Papers (2011).

Strauss, James D., Pardon & Power: A Biblical Theology of Grace (2008).

Strauss, James D., Cosmic Specificity: And Other Papers (2007).

Strauss, James D., The Shattering of Silence: Job, Our Contemporary (Joplin, MO: College Press).

Strauss, James D., “Anthony Thiselton in the Hermeneutical Maze,” Journal for Christian Studies, Vol. 12, (Fall 1993).

Strauss, James D., “Community and Cross-Paradigm Communication,” Journal for Christian Studies, Vol. 6, No. 1 & 2 (Winter 1986/87).

Strauss, James D., “God’s Promise and Universal History,” in Clark Pinnock, ed., 'Grace Unlimited' (Minneapolis, MN: Bethany Fellowship, 1975).
 
Strauss, James D., “A Puritan in a Post-Puritan World—Jonathan Edwards, ” in Clark Pinnock, ed., 'Grace Unlimited' (Minneapolis, MN: Bethany Fellowship, 1975).

Strauss, James D., and Shaw, Wayne, Birth of A Revolution  (Cincinnati, OH: Standard Publishing Co., 1974).

Strauss, James D., "Ethical Relativism, “Honesty,” “Maturity,” and “Nihilism,”  in Carl F. H. Henry, ed., 'Baker’s Dictionary of Christian Ethics' (Grand Rapids, MI: Baker, 1973).

Strauss, James D., The Seer, The Savior, and The Saved (Joplin, MO: College Press, 1972).

Strauss, James D., Newness on the Earth Through Christ: In a Fragmented World Come of Age (Lincoln, IL: Lincoln Christian College Press, 1969).

Strauss, James D., Challenge!!! Response??? World-wide Mission in Light of the Nature of the Church (Lincoln, IL: Lincoln Christian College Press, 1969).

Strauss, James D., “The Christian World View and the Rise of Modern Science,”  Journal for Christian Studies, Vol. 1, no. 2 March 1982 (Lincoln, IL: Lincoln Christian Seminary).
 
Strauss, James D., “Carl Sagan’s Cosmic Connection,” Journal for Christian Studies, Vol. 2, no. 1 (August 1982).
 
Strauss, James D., “Conversion: Horizons on Personal and Social Transformation,” Journal for Christian Studies, Vol. 3, no. 1 (August 1983).
 
Strauss, James D., “The World-view of Karl Marx,” Journal for Christian Studies, Vol. 4, no. 1 (October 1983).
 
Strauss, James D., “The Gospel Commission and Marxism,” Journal for Christian Studies, Vol. 4, no. 1 (October 1983).

Strauss, James D., “Study Guide for the Inspiration of Scripture,” Journal for Christian Studies, Vol. 4, no. 2 (Summer 1984).
 
Strauss, James D., “God’s Authoritative Word and the Gospel According to Gallup,” Journal for Christian Studies, Vol. 4, no. 1 (Summer 1984).

Strauss, James D., “Conflicting Models of Constitutional Hermeneutics,” Journal for Christian Studies, Vol. 8 (Fall 1988).

Strauss, James D., “The Future Isn’t Like It Used To Be (Bibliography),” Journal for Christian Studies, Vol. 9, (1989/90).

Strauss, James D., “Three Titles for Christ,” Christian Standard (March 29, 1958).

Strauss, James D., “The Scriptures and Illness,”  Christian Standard (November 1, 1958).

Strauss, James D., “The Gospel and Non-Christian Religions,” Christian Standard (November 7, 1959).

Strauss, James D., “The Calendar and Special Days,” Christian Standard(April 9, 1960).

Strauss, James D., “What Is Man That Thou Art Mindful of Him?” Christian Standard(September 24, 1960).

Strauss, James D., “The Bible and Politics,” Christian Standard(October 22, 1960).

Strauss, James D., “When The Pope Speaks,” Christian Standard (October 29, 1960).

Strauss, James D., “The Miracle of His Coming,” Christian Standard(December 24, 1960).

Strauss, James D., “What Is Revelation?” Christian Standard(April 22 & 29, 1961).

Strauss, James D., “Translators and Their Theology,”  Christian Standard(October 7, 1961).

Strauss, James D., “The Need of the Hour: Revival Among the People of God,” Christian Standard(October 21, 1961).

Strauss, James D., “Songs for a New-Born King,”  Christian Standard(December 16, 1961).

Strauss, James D., "Race, Redemption, Responsibility,” Christian Standard (February 10 & 17, 1962).

Strauss, James D., "The Nature of the Gift,” Christian Standard(March 2, 1963).

Strauss, James D., “Death Be Not Proud,” Christian Standard (April 6, 13, & 20, 1963).

Strauss, James D., “Handel’s Messiah,”  Christian Standard (June 22, 1963).

Strauss, James D., “A Most Disturbing Book!” Christian Standard(November 9, 1963).

Strauss, James D., “The Master Blessing” Christian Standard (December 12, 1964).

Strauss, James D., “Seeing Cities Through the Tears of Jesus” Christian Standard (May 24, 1969).

Strauss, James D., “Resurrection Living and the Growth of the Church” Christian Standard(March 21, 1970).

Strauss, James D., “The Fellowship of the Forgiven,” Christian Standard (April 25, 1970).

Strauss, James D., “The World Tomorrow,” Christian Standard(November 14, 1971).

Strauss, James D., “Isaiah Revisited,” Christian Standard(December 5, 1971).

Strauss, James D., “The Crucified God and Man’s Search for Justice” Christian Standard(April 8, 1979).

Strauss, James D., “A Time for Laughter” Christian Standard (July 8 & 15, 1979).

In addition to his published works, the Lincoln Christian Seminary library in Lincoln, Illinois, maintains a file of class syllabi, bibliographies, and papers that Dr. Strauss has written and compiled. These are only available for use in the Library and may not be checked out. This listing does not cover the entire collection of papers individually, but instead gives in broad strokes the wide-ranging nature of this remarkable collection of documents.

A 50. Research Bibliography for Philosophy and Christian Doctrine.

A 60. Research Bibliography: Theology and Prophecy (1980 ff).

A 70. Research Bibliography: Philosophy (1980 ff).

A 80. Wagner Bibliography on Liberation Theology.

B 343. Romans.

B 346. Hebrews.

B 413. Nature of the Bible.

B 623. Seminar in Biblical Theology.

B 624. Theology of Old Testament Prophets.

B 644. Reformation Theology: Comparative Critique of Luther and Calvin.

B 653. Advanced New Testament: Theology of Promise.

B 660. Major Theological Systems I: Apostolic to Aquinas.

B 661. Major Theological Systems II: Aquinas to 20th Century.

B 666. Doctrine of Creation and Covenant.

B 667. Nineteenth Century Theology: Classical Liberalism.

B 668. Twentieth Century Theology: Theological Pluralism.

B 669. American Theology and the Crisis of Neo-evangelicalism.

B 675. Seminar: God as Creator and Redeemer.

B 676. Seminar: Doctrine of Creation, Covenant, and Redemption.

B 677. Man: The Imago Dei.

B 678. Seminar: Biblical Theology of Sin and Salvation.

B 679. Word of God: Cross Cultural Communication.

B 680. Seminar: Doctrine and the People of God.

B 681. Seminar: Christ: The Incarnational Model.

B 682. Seminar: Consummation of Creation (Eschatology).

B 683. Seminar: Spirit of God.

B 688. Christian Existence/Theological Ethics.

G 301. I.D.S.

G 587. Christian Faith and Theories of Logic.

G 680. Christian Faith and the Development of the Physical Sciences.

G 681. Christian Faith and Development of Biological Theories of Evolution.

G 682. Christian Faith and the Development of the Behavioral Sciences.

G 683. Christian Faith and the Development of Political and Economical Theories.

G 684. Christian Faith and Theories of the Origin and Nature of Language.

G 685. Christian Faith and Changing Views of Law.

G 686. Christian Faith and Theories of Mind.

G 687. Christian Faith and Theories of History.

G 689. Christian Faith and Philosophical Theories of Ethics.

G 690. Spiritual Formation: Classical Devotional Literature.

G 691. Apologetics (Eristics): Discovering the Christian Mind.

G 692. The Making of the Contemporary Mind.

G 693. Christian Faith and Creative Imagination.

G 694. Christian Faith and Theories of Knowledge.

G 695. Major Philosophical Thinkers and Systems I.

G 696. Major Philosophical Thinkers and Systems II.

G 697. Origin and Nature of the Enlightenment (Aufklarung).

G 698. Seminar: Models of Scientific Knowledge.

G 699. Hegel to Marx: Liberation Theologies.

G 782. Contemporary Religious Movements: Cult/Occult.

G 783. Philosophy of Religion.

G 784. Hermeneutics: From the Bible to the Reformation.

G 785. Theological Method and Hermeneutics from Schleiermacher to Gadamer.

G 789. Seminar: Western and Eastern Catholic Theologians.

TP 500/501. Cult/Occult.

TP 600. Foundations of Biblical Theology: Theology of Promise.

TP 602. Doctrine of Creation, Covenant, and Redemption.

TP 603. Imago Dei: Man as Incarnate Subject.

TP 606. Doctrine of the People of God.

TP 607. Christ: Affirming the Incarnation Today.

TP 609. Spirit of God.

TP 610. Fundamental Grace Theologies.

TP 661. 19th Century Theology: Classical Liberalism.

TP 662. 20th Century Theology: Theological Pluralism.

TP 663. American Theology: From Puritanism to Neo-Evangelicalism.

TP 701. Christian Faith and Scientific Revolution.

TP 703. Christian Faith and Biological Theories of Evolution.

TP 704. Christian Faith and Changing Views of the Social Sciences.

TP 705. Christian Faith and Theories of Origin and Nature of Language.

TP 708. Christian Faith and Theories of History.

TP 711. Christian Faith and Development of Political and Economic Theories.

TP 750. Theology of Preaching.

TP 800. Apologetics (Eristics): Discovering the Christian Mind.

TP 801. The Making of the Post-Modern Mind: Naturalistic/Secularistic.

TP 802. Exploring the Roots of Secular Humanism: The Enlightenment.

TP 803. Models of Scientific Knowledge.

TP 804. Hegel to Marx: Liberation Theologies.

TP 805. Contemporary Roman Catholicism.

TP 806. Hermeneutics From the Bible to the Reformation.

TP 807. Theological Method and Hermeneutics: From Scheiermacher to Gadamer.

TP 808. Christian Existence.

American theologians
Arminian theologians
1929 births
2014 deaths
Indiana University alumni
Hermeneutists
People from Herrin, Illinois
People from Vermilion County, Illinois